Rodolfo Sciammarella (1902–1973) was an Argentine composer who worked on many film scores during his career.

Selected filmography
 Isabelita (1940)
 Honeymoon in Rio (1940)
 The Tango Star (1940)
 Melodies of America (1941)
Cristina (1946)
 The Tango Returns to Paris (1948)
 The Bohemian Soul (1949)
 Off to Havana I Go (1951)

References

Bibliography 
 Alberto Elena & Marina Díaz López. The Cinema of Latin America. Columbia University Press, 2013.

External links 
 

1902 births
1973 deaths
Argentine film score composers
People from Buenos Aires
20th-century composers